The Arctic bluet (Coenagrion johanssoni) is a damselfly which is part of the family of Coenagrionidae.

Range 
The Arctic bluet is found in Northern Europe, and east through Asia as far as the Amur River. It is not found in Denmark. It is found in Finland and northern Sweden, but only in the mountains. It is also found in southern Norway as far north as Troms. They are common in the østlandet, but seldom in the vestlandet.

Appearance 
The Arctic bluet is one of the smallest damselflies in Norway. The female is very similar to the male and has smaller characteristic stripes on its back.

The wings are held behind the body. The wingspan is between 32 and 40 millimetres.

References 

 Olsvik, Hans. 1996. Øyenstikkere i Møre & Romsdal, VestNorge, status for atlasprosjektet pr. 1995 Nordisk Odonatologisk forum. Vol 2,  side 16
 Sahlén, Göran. 1996. Sveriges Trollsländor. Feltbiogerna. 165 sider.

External links 
 Nordisk blåvannymfe - www.nhm.uio.no/norodo/  - A Norwegian-language website on Norwegian odonata.

Coenagrionidae
Insects described in 1894
Damselflies of Europe
Insects of the Arctic